John Angel (November 1, 1881 – October 16, 1960) was a British-born sculptor, architectural and ecclesiastical sculptor, medallist and lecturer.  He emigrated to the United States where he created architectural sculpture. His work in the United Kingdom and the United States has been critically praised.

Biography
He was born in Newton Abbot, Devon, England, the son of a tailor, and one of ten children. He entered a seven-year apprenticeship to a wood carver at the age of 14 years.
 He received formal training at the Exeter School of Art and later at the Lambeth School of Art. George Frampton became his mentor at the Royal Academy School, and his influence resonated in Angel's work. Angel also studied with Sir Thomas Brock. His professional progression is verified by census data: his occupation in the Census of England and Wales, 1901 was; "Wood Carver – Appren[tice]" and in the 1911 census, "Sculptor". Turning 30, he was elected in 1919 to the Royal Society of British Sculptors.

His work in the United Kingdom includes the Exeter War Memorial and the Bridgwater War Memorial  also known as the "Angel of Bridgwater".
 
He was especially noted for evocative ecclesiastical sculptures.  He spent many years doing the six bronze doors at St. Patrick's Cathedral in New York City. He teamed with architect Ralph Adams Cram in outfitting Pittsburgh's East Liberty Presbyterian Church, colloquially known as the "Cathedral of Hope," and did the Last Supper group in marble  as well as  tympana over several entrances. The commissions and awards were numerous.

In 1930 he completed the Founder's Memorial at Rice University  depicting a seated William Marsh Rice  in line with specifications by architect Ralph Adams Cram. He also produced sculptures for chapels at Princeton University, St. Paul's School (Concord, New Hampshire) and the Desloge Hospital (Desloge Chapel) in St. Louis, Missouri.

A statue of Alexander Hamilton in Lincoln Park in Chicago, Illinois was mired in controversy, at least concerning the surrounding architecture. Kate Sturges Buckingham (1858–1937), of the Buckingham Fountain family, commissioned the monument. Its impetus was that Treasury Secretary Hamilton "secured the nation’s financial future and made it possible for her own family to make its fortune in grain elevators and banking." Consequently, John Angel was hired to model a figurative sculpture and the Finnish architect Eliel Saarinen was to create a "colossal architectural setting" for it.  The proposed 80-foot tall columned shelter was poorly received. By Ms. Buckingham's death in 1937, the sculpture's setting, location and design were uncertain. Conspiracy allegations surfaced, and the matter became mired in litigation. After the courts ordered the construction to be completed by 1953, the trustees hired architect Samuel A. Marx. It was built, but structural problems appeared, and it was eventually demolished in 1993. The statue was gilded, and is still on display.

Personal life
While he was living in London, he married Elizabeth Day Seymour (1876 Hudson, Ohio – January 6, 1942) on April 25, 1914. They had met in Greece at a time when he "was a promising young sculptor." She was the daughter of Professor Thomas Day Seymour, of Yale University, and was educated at Bryn Mawr, becoming an American classicist. They had two children and the family went to the United States in 1925, upon the request of architect Ralph Adams Cram. In his autobiography Cram wrote, "John Angel had come to America for a visit, and we had induced him, rather against his will I fancy, to do for us...Out of the blue, so to speak, had fallen upon us the very sculptor we had dreamed of but hardly dared hope for."

British-American biological anthropologist John Lawrence Angel (1915–1986) was Angel-Seymour's son.

Death and legacy
When he died in Sandy Hook, Connecticut, he was reputed to be one of America's foremost sculptors; some considered him unrivaled for the times, comparing him to some of the finest sculptors of the Middle Ages. Two main works were at the Cathedral of St. John the Divine in New York City, and in the George Rogers Clark National Historical Park in Vincennes, Indiana.  The latter includes a rendering of Francis Vigo. Angel himself proclaimed the ten-ton Vigo sculpture to be probably the best he had ever done.  He described the style of most of his work as ersatz 13th Century Gothic. But says Angel, "I use all my knowledge of the human figure, so what we call Gothic is Gothic with a difference."  By nature self-deprecating, he noted: "I never went to school; I'm an ignoramus."

His and his wife Elizabeth's remains are interred at Zoar Cemetery, also known as Berkshire Cemetery, in Fairfield County, Connecticut.

The Smithsonian Institution has 4.1 linear feet of his biographic material, books, sketches, 30 sketch books, photographs and papers, that were donated by Henry S. Angel in 1981.  Elizabeth Day Seymour's papers are with her family's 51 linear feet on deposit at the Yale University Library.

Honors
 Hon. LittD, Columbia University (1936)
 Fellow of the International Institute of Arts and Letters (1956)
 Member, Mediaeval Academy of America
 Member, Architectural League
 Member, National Sculpture Society of America
 Member, National Academy of Design.
 Member, National Sculpture Society,
 Member, Royal Society of Sculptors (1919)

Bibliography

Footnotes

References

Sources

Further reading

See also

Gothic art

External links

 John Angel Memorial #41083891 at Find a Grave
 John Angel Obituary at rootsweb.

1881 births
1960 deaths
Alumni of the Lambeth School of Art
Alumni of the Royal Academy Schools
American architectural sculptors
American male sculptors
Burials in Connecticut
English expatriates in the United States
English sculptors
English male sculptors
People from Fairfield, Connecticut
People from Newton Abbot
20th-century American sculptors
20th-century English male artists
People from Sandy Hook, Connecticut
20th-century American male artists